Morris Memorial Hospital for Crippled Children, also known as Morris Memorial Nursing Home, is a historic hospital building located at Milton, Cabell County, West Virginia.  It was built in 1936 by the Works Progress Administration as a hospital for children with polio.  The modified "U"-shaped limestone building consists of a two-story central section, flanked by -story, "Y" shaped wings.  The central section features a domed and louvered cupola and a two-story portico.  It has a "T"-shaped wing used as a school and a boiler house attached to the school wing by a hyphen.  The hospital closed in 1960.  It was subsequently used as a nursing home until 2009.

It was listed on the National Register of Historic Places in 2013.

Further reading
Morris Memorial Hospital for Crippled Children at Abandoned

References

Works Progress Administration in West Virginia
Hospital buildings on the National Register of Historic Places in West Virginia
Colonial Revival architecture in West Virginia
Hospital buildings completed in 1936
Buildings and structures in Cabell County, West Virginia
National Register of Historic Places in Cabell County, West Virginia